Elin Wikström is a Swedish artist and manager, born 1965 in Karlskrona. She lives in Gothenburg/Umeå, and was professor at the Umeå Academy of Fine Arts 2001–2005, and manager at the Gerlesborg School of Fine Art 2015-2022.

Education

1987–1992 Valand School of Fine Arts, Gothenburg University

Solo exhibitions

2004 Rebecka väntar på Anna, Anna väntar på Cecilia, Cecilia väntar på Marie..., Moderna Museet, Stockholm 
2003 Cool or lame?, Gallery Brändström & Stene, Stockholm
2003 Cool or lame?, Gallery Hlemmur, Reykjavik 
2000 ...the need to be free..., Dundee Contemporary Arts, Dundee

References

External links
Academy of Fine Art, Umeå
ART FACTS
Museum of Modern Art, Stockholm

1965 births
Living people
Swedish artists
Academic staff of Umeå University
Swedish women academics